Standard Oil Building is a historic building in Whittier, California.  Built in 1914, it was designed by Rea & Garstang in the Spanish Colonial Revival architectural style.  The building was built for the Standard Oil Company, which had begun successfully drilling for oil in 1910 in the area.  The building was added to the National Register of Historic Places in 1980, and is now used as a restaurant, beauty salon, and day spa.

The Standard Oil Building refers to a small complex of buildings around a courtyard;  the first-built portion, built in 1914, is [[Mission

References

Whittier, California
Buildings and structures on the National Register of Historic Places in Los Angeles County, California
Commercial buildings on the National Register of Historic Places in California
Buildings and structures in Los Angeles County, California
Commercial buildings completed in 1914
Spanish Colonial Revival architecture in California